Amir Zafar (born 30 January 1965) is a Pakistani field hockey player. He competed in the men's tournament at the 1988 Summer Olympics. His father, Zafar Ali Zafari, also played field hockey for the Pakistan national hockey team.

References

External links
 

1965 births
Living people
Pakistani male field hockey players
Olympic field hockey players of Pakistan
Field hockey players at the 1988 Summer Olympics
Field hockey players from Rawalpindi